Miloš Lepović (born October 3, 1987) is a Serbian football midfielder, who plays for OFK Beograd.

Career
Lepović has spent the vast of his career so far in his home-town club Radnički Kragujevac. In two occasions he was a member of Mokra Gora and have spent a half-season with Macedonian giants Vardar.

During winter 2009 he came back to Radnički Kragujevac and helped club to win two successive promotions, from Serbian SuperLiga Serbian League West. 
In 2012 Lepović had a dispute with a chairmen of Radnički and left club, soon to join FK Jagodina, also a Serbian SuperLiga member team.

On 5 July 2019 OFK Beograd announced, that Lepović had joined the club.

Honours
Radnički Kragujevac
Serbian First League: 2010–11

Jagodina
Serbian Cup: 2013

References

External links
 Profile at srbijafudbal.net 
 Profile at utakmica.rs 
 

1987 births
Living people
Sportspeople from Kragujevac
Serbian footballers
FK Jagodina players
FK Vardar players
FK Radnički 1923 players
FK Mladost Lučani players
FK Novi Pazar players
Balzan F.C. players
OFK Beograd players
Serbian SuperLiga players
Maltese Premier League players
Expatriate footballers in North Macedonia
Expatriate footballers in Malta
Serbian expatriate footballers
Serbian expatriate sportspeople in North Macedonia
Serbian expatriate sportspeople in Malta
Association football midfielders